Ashton under Hill is a village and civil parish in the Wychavon district of Worcestershire in England.  It is situated at the foot of Bredon Hill.  According to the 2001 census the parish had a population of 743, about six miles south-west of Evesham. A five house hamlet named Paris is located above the village with panoramic views over the surrounding hills.

History

Historically part of Gloucestershire, it was transferred to Worcestershire under the Provisional Order Confirmation (Gloucestershire, Warwickshire and Worcestershire) Act 1931.

The village church, St Barbara's is dedicated to St Barbara who is alleged to afford protection from lightning strikes. In 2005, villagers celebrated the 900th anniversary of the church.

The author Fred Archer lived in Ashton at Stanley's Farm.  He wrote a series of popular books about tales of country life.  The books described life in the village between the years 1876 and 1939.

Railways
Ashton-under-Hill railway station belonged to the Midland Railway (later part of the LMS). It was situated on a lengthy loop line, Gloucester Loop Line branching off the Birmingham and Gloucester Railway main line at Ashchurch, passing through Evesham railway station, Alcester and Redditch, and rejoining the main line at Barnt Green, near Bromsgrove. The loop was built to address the fact that the main line bypassed most of the towns it might otherwise have served, but it took three separate companies to complete.

The loop officially closed between Ashchurch and Redditch in June 1963, but poor condition of the track had brought about withdrawal of all trains between Evesham and Redditch earlier, in October 1962, being replaced by a bus service for the final eight months. Redditch to Barnt Green remains open on the electrified Birmingham suburban network.

Ashton under Hill station house still stands as a private residence.

Schools
The school Bredon Hill Academy is located in Ashton under Hill. In October 2015 it received an Ofsted rating of outstanding. Ashton under Hill First also follows the amazing standings set by the middle school in that it too received an outstanding award from ofsted. The pair of schools boast a huge pull factor for many families outside the village applying for their children to be accepted to the school. Ashton is located near to the Bredon Hill satellite villages of Conderton, Beckford, Elmley Castle, Overbury and Kemerton.

References

External links
 
 Ashton under Hill community site
 Bredon Hill Academy web site
 

Villages in Worcestershire